Jesús Armando Vargas Rojas (born 26 August 1999) is a Venezuelan professional footballer who plays as a winger for Estudiantes de Mérida.

Club career
Vargas joined Argentinian side Gimnasia in January 2019 on an 18-month loan deal.

Career statistics

Club

Notes

References

1999 births
Living people
Venezuelan footballers
Venezuela under-20 international footballers
Venezuelan expatriate footballers
Association football forwards
Venezuelan Primera División players
Estudiantes de Mérida players
Venezuelan expatriate sportspeople in Argentina
Expatriate footballers in Argentina
Venezuela youth international footballers
People from Mérida, Mérida